Fernando Barros Bezerra Júnior (born 1 June 1991), simply known as Fernandinho is a Brazilian professional footballer who plays mainly as a left back.

Club career 
Born in Recife, Brazil, Fernandinho had a short stint with the Náutico reserves in 2010. Between 2012 and 2013, he played for Belo Jardim in Pernembucano 3 making 35 appearances before signing for Central in 2013.

Later that year, he was transferred to Portuguese Segunda Liga outfit Portimonense.

References

External links 
 
 

1991 births
Sportspeople from Recife
Living people
Association football defenders
Brazilian footballers
Belo Jardim Futebol Clube players
Central Sport Club players
Portimonense S.C. players
América Futebol Clube (PE) players
União Agrícola Barbarense Futebol Clube players
Campeonato Pernambucano players
Campeonato Brasileiro Série D players
Liga Portugal 2 players
Brazilian expatriate footballers
Expatriate footballers in Portugal